The Remington SR-8 was a prototype sniper rifle developed by Remington Arms. It was originally developed for the Italian Army, and was designed to shoot the .338 Lapua cartridge. The design of the rifle is based on the Remington Model 700, with the trigger assembly and design taken largely from the M24.  The ejector design had to be modified from that of the standard Model 700 to allow for the larger rim of the .338 Lapua cartridge.

The status of the project is unknown, though it has likely been shelved.

It is used in a popular free online game called Urban Terror, and in the Wolfenstein: Enemy Territory mod TrueCombat:Elite.

References 
http://www.snipercentral.com/sr8.htm

Sniper rifles of the United States
Remington Arms firearms
Bolt-action rifles of the United States